The Castaibert series of monoplane aeroplanes were designed and built by Pablo (Paul) Castaibert, a Frenchman living in Argentina, in the years before and during World War I. His designs were inspired by aircraft he had seen in France.

Variants 
 Castaibert I – Built in 1910, not capable of flight.
 Castaibert II – Built in 1911.
 Castaibert III – Built in 1912.
 Castaibert IV – Built in 1913. Four delivered to the Escuela Militar de Aeronáutica in Uruguay.
 Castaibert V – Built in 1914. One delivered to Uruguay.
 Castaibert VI – Built in 1915.
 Castaibert VII – Built in 1915.

Operators
Argentine Air Force
Uruguayan Air Force

See also
 Raúl Pateras Pescara
 IMPA Tu-Sa
 Tucán T-1

References

Notes

Bibliography 
 Bell, Dana ed. The Smithsonian National Air and Space Museum Directory of Airplanes, Their Designers and Manufacturers. Smithsonian Institution. 
 "Shoestring Top Cover...The Uruguayan Air Force". Air International, Vol. 39 No. 2, August 1990. pp. 65–73.

External links
 Airliners.net photo of a Castaibert aeroplane.
 (spanish) History and pictures of the Castaibert III/912 in service with the Urugyayan Air Force

1910s Argentine aircraft